The House of Lancaster is the name of both a current strip club in Toronto that opened in 1983, and a former strip club in Etobicoke that operated from 1982 to 2017.

Both were opened by Spiro and Terry Koumoudouros.

Ownership 
Both clubs were opened by brothers Spiro and Terry Koumoudouros and were ranked the third best strip club by BlogTO in 2012.

Etobicoke club 
The House of Lancaster in Etobicoke was a strip club located in a residential area on The Queensway. Most of the club was occupied by female dancers targeting male customers, although the Foxxes Den-branded west wing of the building employed male dancers targeting female customers.

The club opened in 1982, and was initially branded as the Hollywood Tavern.

A male dancer was arrested and charged with sexual assault in 2009. The conviction of another male dancer in 2016 was quashed at the appeal court in 2019 granting him a right to a retrial. The Etobicoke club was the scene of three shootings that occurred in 2013, 2014 and 2015. The 2014 shooting happened on December 30, when a man was shot multiple times outside the club. The shooting prompted residents to increase their advocacy against the presence of a strip club in a residential area. 

The club was sold in 2017, and demolished by the new owners Parallax real estate company on February 21, 2018.

Toronto club 
The Toronto House of Lancaster strip club is located at 1215 Bloor Street in Bloordale, Toronto and club opened in 1983. It closed during start of COVID-19 pandemic, but opened in August 2020 to customers who make phone reservations and wore face masks.

In 2011, the club took hosted a poetry reading event as part of the 100,000 Poets for a Change event, featuring a reading by city councillor Ana Bailão.

The club featured in episode of Degrassi High television series when fictional characters Joey Jeremiah, Snake, and Wheels decided to visit a strip club.

See also 

 Zanzibar Tavern
 The Brass Rail (Toronto)
 Le Strip

References

External links 
 Official website

Strip clubs in Canada
1983 establishments in Ontario
1982 establishments in Ontario
2017 disestablishments in Ontario
Companies based in Toronto